CSA may refer to:

Arts and media
 Canadian Screen Awards, annual awards given by the Academy of Canadian Cinema & Television
 Commission on Superhuman Activities, a fictional American government agency in Marvel Comics
 Crime Syndicate of America, DC Comics supervillains
 C.S.A.: The Confederate States of America, 2004 alternative history mockumentary

Law

 Combined statistical area, defined by the U.S. Office of Management and Budget
 Commission sharing agreement, in financial services
 Controlled Substances Act, in U.S. drug policy
 Credit Support Annex, a legal document regulating collateral for derivative transactions

Organizations

For-profit businesses
 CSA (database company) (formerly Cambridge Scientific Abstracts)
 Connectivity Standards Alliance (formerly Zigbee Alliance)
 Czech Airlines (ICAO designator CSA; abbreviated ČSA)
 Czech Sport Aircraft, an aircraft manufacturer

Government and military
 Canadian Securities Administrators, an organization of provincial and territorial securities regulators
 Canadian Space Agency, the national space agency of Canada
 Central Statistical Agency of Ethiopia
 Chief of Staff of the United States Army
 Civil Services Academy Lahore, Pakistan
 Compliance, Safety, and Accountability, an American commercial vehicle driver safety program; see Federal Motor Carrier Safety Administration
 Confederate States of America, a break-away republic in North America that lasted from 1861 to 1865
 Confederate States Army
 Conseil supérieur de l'audiovisuel, a French broadcast content monitoring agency
 CSA Group (formerly the Canadian Standards Association, or CSA), a standards organization based in Canada
 Cyber Security Agency (Singapore)

Professional and trade organizations and unions
 Autonomous Trade Unions Centre (Central des Syndicats Autonomes du Bénin), a trade union centre in Benin
 California Society of Anesthesiologists
 CarSharing Association, a federation of carsharing organizations
 Casting Society of America
 Central Student Association, University of Guelph, Ontario, Canada
 Civil Service Alliance, former British trade union federation
 Civil Service Association, Trinidad and Tobago
 Chemical Abstracts Service, a division of the American Chemical Society
 Cloud Security Alliance, which promotes IT security best practices
 College Student Alliance, a federation of student unions, based in Ontario, Canada
 Council of School Supervisors & Administrators, a New York City-based trade union
 Czech Society of Actuaries

Sport
 Canadian Soccer Association, the governing body of soccer in Canada
 Cano Sport Academy, a football club in Equatorial Guinea
 Centro Sportivo Alagoano, a football club, Maceió, Alagoas, Brazil
 Cricket South Africa

Other organizations
 Campaign for a Scottish Assembly, an association of Scottish political parties and civic groups established in 1989
 Canadian Snowbird Association, for travelling Canadians
 Celiac Sprue Association, a disease support group in the United States
 Certified Senders Alliance, a German whitelist for bulk email senders
 Child Support Agency (UK)
 Child Support Agency Australia
 City School of Architecture, an architecture school in Colombo, Sri Lanka
 Colegio San Agustin (disambiguation), several Catholic schools
 The Covenant, The Sword, and the Arm of the Lord, a 1970s-1980s white supremacist group in Arkansas, United States

Science, mathematics, and technology

Mathematics and computing
 Cartan subalgebra
 Central simple algebra
 Client SMTP Authorization
 Common Scrambling Algorithm
 Intel Communication Streaming Architecture
 Curved Surface Area
 Cross sectional area

Medicine and psychology
 Cationic steroid antibiotics, a family of compounds used to treat diseases
 Central sleep apnea, a sleep disorder 
 CernySmith Assessment, a psychological stress questionnaire
 Clinical Skills Assessment exam
 Cockayne syndrome A or ERCC8, a gene whose mutation causes Cockayne syndrome
 Cognitive styles analysis, a computerized measure of cognitive styles
 Cyclosporin A, an immunosuppressant drug

Other uses in science, mathematics, and technology
 Camphorsulfonic acid
 Cardioid subwoofer array
 Common Support Aircraft
 Köppen classification of hot-summer Mediterranean climate, abbreviated Csa
 Chemical Safety Assessment
 Carry-save adder or Carry-skip adder, two different types of adders
 Chief Scientific Adviser (disambiguation)
 CSA keyboard layout, keyboard layout used in Canada

Other uses
 Chief Scout's Award (disambiguation)
 Child sexual abuse
 Community-supported agriculture, an alternative socioeconomic model of agriculture and food distribution
 Competition Stableford Adjustment, a golf scoring adjustment for handicapping purposes
 Customer Service Advisor, a job title